In astronomy, an analemma is a diagram showing the position of the Sun in the sky as seen from a fixed location on Earth at the same mean solar time, as that position varies over the course of a year. The diagram will resemble a figure eight. Globes of Earth often display an analemma as a two-dimensional figure of equation of time vs. declination of the Sun.

The north–south component of the analemma results from the change in the Sun's declination due to the tilt of Earth's axis of rotation. The east–west component results from the nonuniform rate of change of the Sun's right ascension, governed by combined effects of Earth's axial tilt and orbital eccentricity.

One can photograph an analemma by keeping a camera at a fixed location and orientation and taking multiple exposures throughout the year, always at the same time of day (disregarding daylight saving time, if applicable).

Diagrams of analemmas frequently carry marks that show the position of the Sun at various closely spaced dates throughout the year. Analemmas with date marks can be used for various practical purposes.

Analemmas (as they are known today) have been used in conjunction with sundials since the 18th century to convert between apparent and mean solar time. Before this, the term had a more generic meaning that referred to a graphical procedure of representing three-dimensional objects in two dimensions, now known as orthographic projection.

Although the term analemma usually refers to Earth's solar analemma, it can be applied to other celestial bodies as well.

Description 
An analemma can be traced by plotting the position of the Sun as viewed from a fixed position on Earth at the same clock time every day for an entire year, or by plotting a graph of the Sun's declination against the equation of time. The resulting curve resembles a long, slender figure-eight with one lobe much larger than the other. This curve is commonly printed on terrestrial globes, usually in the eastern Pacific Ocean, the only large tropical region with very little land. It is possible, though challenging, to photograph the analemma, by leaving the camera in a fixed position for an entire year and snapping images on 24-hour intervals (or some multiple thereof); see section below.

The long axis of the figure—the line segment joining the northernmost point on the analemma to the southernmost—is bisected by the celestial equator, to which it is approximately perpendicular, and has a "length" of twice the obliquity of the ecliptic, i.e., about 47°. The component along this axis of the Sun's apparent motion is a result of the familiar seasonal variation of the declination of the Sun through the year. The "width" of the figure is due to the equation of time, and its angular extent is the difference between the greatest positive and negative deviations of local solar time from local mean time when this time-difference is related to angle at the rate of 15° per hour, i.e., 360° in 24 h. This width of the analemma is approximately 7.7°, so the length of the figure is more than six times its width. The difference in size of the lobes of the figure-eight form arises mainly from the fact that the perihelion and aphelion occur far from equinoxes. They also occur a mere couple of weeks after solstices, which in turn causes slight tilt of the figure eight and its minor lateral asymmetry.

There are three parameters that affect the size and shape of the analemma—obliquity, eccentricity, and the angle between the apse line and the line of solstices. Viewed from an object with a perfectly circular orbit and no axial tilt, the Sun would always appear at the same point in the sky at the same time of day throughout the year and the analemma would be a dot. For an object with a circular orbit but significant axial tilt, the analemma would be a figure of eight with northern and southern lobes equal in size. For an object with an eccentric orbit but no axial tilt, the analemma would be a straight east–west line along the celestial equator.

The north–south component of the analemma shows the Sun's declination, its latitude on the celestial sphere, or the latitude on the Earth at which the Sun is directly overhead. The east–west component shows the equation of time, or the difference between solar time and local mean time. This can be interpreted as how "fast" or "slow" the Sun (or an analemmatic sundial) is compared to clock time.  It also shows how far west or east the Sun is, compared with its mean position. The analemma can be considered as a graph in which the Sun's declination and the equation of time are plotted against each other. In many diagrams of the analemma, a third dimension, that of time, is also included, shown by marks that represent the position of the Sun at various, fairly closely spaced, dates throughout the year.

In diagrams, the analemma is drawn as it would be seen in the sky by an observer looking upward. If north is at the top, west is to the right. This corresponds with the sign of the equation of time, which is positive in the westward direction. The further west the Sun is, compared with its mean position, the more "fast" a sundial is, compared with a clock. (See Equation of time#Sign of the equation of time.) If the analemma is a graph with positive declination (north) plotted upward, positive equation of time (west) is plotted to the right. This is the conventional orientation for graphs. When the analemma is marked on a geographical globe, west in the analemma is to the right, while the geographical features on the globe are shown with west to the left. To avoid this confusion, it has been suggested that analemmas on globes should be printed with west to the left, but this is not done, at least, not frequently. In practice, the analemma is so nearly symmetrical that the shapes of the mirror images are not easily distinguished, but if date markings are present, they go in opposite directions. The Sun moves eastward on the analemma near the solstices. This can be used to tell which way the analemma is printed. See the image above, at high magnification.

An analemma that includes an image of a solar eclipse has been called a tutulemma, a term coined by photographers Cenk E. Tezel and Tunç Tezel based on the Turkish word for eclipse.

As seen from Earth

Owing to the tilt of Earth's axis (23.439°) and the Earth's orbital eccentricity, the relative location of the Sun above the horizon is not constant from day to day when observed at the same clock time each day. If the time of observation is not 12:00 noon local mean time, then depending on one's geographical latitude, this loop will be inclined at different angles.

The figure on the right is an example of an analemma as seen from the Earth's northern hemisphere. It is a plot of the position of the Sun at 12:00 noon at Royal Observatory, Greenwich, England (latitude 51.48°N, longitude 0.0015°W) during the year 2006. The horizontal axis is the azimuth angle in degrees (180° is facing south). The vertical axis is the altitude in degrees above the horizon. The first day of each month is shown in black, and the solstices and equinoxes are shown in green. It can be seen that the equinoxes occur approximately at altitude , and the solstices occur approximately at altitudes  where ε  is the axial tilt of the Earth, 23.4°. The analemma is plotted with its width highly exaggerated, revealing a slight asymmetry (due to the two-week misalignment between the apsides of the Earth's orbit and its solstices).

The analemma is oriented with the smaller loop appearing north of the larger loop. At the North Pole, the analemma would be completely upright (an 8 with the small loop at the top), and only the top half of it would be visible. Heading south, once south of the Arctic Circle, the entire analemma would become visible. If seen at noon, it continues to be upright, and rises higher from the horizon as the viewer moves south. At the equator it is directly overhead. Further south it moves toward the northern horizon, and is then seen with the larger loop at the top. If viewed at the analemma in the early morning or evening, it would start to tilt to one side as the viewer moves southward from the North Pole. At the equator the analemma would be completely horizontal. As the viewer continued south it would rotate so that the small loop was beneath the large loop in the sky. Crossing the Antarctic Circle the analemma, now nearly completely inverted, would start to disappear, until only 50%, part of the larger loop, was visible from the South Pole.

See equation of time for a more detailed description of the east–west characteristics of the analemma.

Photography
The first successful analemma photograph ever made was created in 1978–79 by photographer Dennis di Cicco over Watertown, Massachusetts. Without moving his camera, he made 44 exposures on a single frame of film, all taken at the same time of day at least a week apart. A foreground image and three long-exposure images were also included in the same frame, bringing the total number of exposures to 48.

Calculated analemmas

While photographing analemmas may present technical and practical challenges, they can be calculated conveniently and presented in 3D plots for any given location on the surface of the Earth.

The idea is based on the unit vector with its origin fixed at a chosen point on the surface of the Earth and its direction pointing to the center of the Sun all the time. If we calculate the position of the Sun, namely, the solar zenith angle and solar azimuth angle at say, one-hour step, for an entire year, the head of the unit vector traces out 24 analemmas on the unit sphere centered on the chosen point, and this unit sphere is equivalent to the celestial sphere. The figure on the right is the "wreath of analemmas" calculated for the geographic center of the contiguous United States.

As often seen on a globe, the analemma is also often plotted as a two-dimensional figure of equation of time vs. declination of the Sun. The adjacent figure ("Analemma: Equation of time...") is calculated using the algorithm presented in the reference that uses the formulas given in The Astronomical Almanac for the Year 2019.

Estimating sunrise and sunset data
If marked to show the position of the Sun on it at fairly regular intervals (such as the 1st, 11th, and 21st days of every calendar month) the analemma summarises the apparent motion of the Sun, relative to its mean position, throughout the year. A date-marked diagram of the analemma, with equal scales in both north–south and east–west directions, can be used as a tool to estimate quantities such as the times of sunrise and sunset, which depend on the Sun's position. Generally, making these estimates depends on visualizing the analemma as a rigid structure in the sky, which moves around the Earth at constant speed so it rises and sets once a day, with the Sun slowly moving around it once a year.

Some approximations are involved in the process, chiefly the use of a plane diagram to represent things on the celestial sphere, and the use of drawing and measurement instead of numerical calculation. Because of these, the estimates are not perfectly precise, but they are usually good enough for practical purposes. Also, they have instructional value, showing in a simple visual way how the times of sunrises and sunsets vary.

Earliest and latest sunrise and sunset

The analemma can be used to find the dates of the earliest and latest sunrises and sunsets of the year. These do not occur on the dates of the solstices.

With reference to the image of a simulated analemma in the eastern sky, the lowest point of the analemma has just risen above the horizon. If the Sun were at that point, sunrise would have just occurred. This would be the latest sunrise of the year, since all other points on the analemma would rise earlier. Therefore, the date of the latest sunrise is when the Sun is at this lowest point (29 December, when the analemma is tilted as seen from latitude 50° north, as is shown in the diagram); however, in some areas that use daylight saving time, the date of the latest sunrise occurs on the day before daylight saving time ends. Similarly, when the Sun is at the highest point on the analemma, near its top-left end, (on 15 June) the earliest sunrise of the year will occur. Likewise, at sunset, the earliest sunset will occur when the Sun is at its lowest point on the analemma when it is close to the western horizon, and the latest sunset when it is at the highest point.

None of these points is exactly at one of the ends of the analemma, where the Sun is at a solstice. As seen from northern middle latitudes, as the diagram shows, the earliest sunset occurs some time before the December solstice – typically a week or two before it – and the latest sunrise happens a week or two after the solstice. Thus, the darkest evening occurs in early to mid-December, but the mornings keep getting darker until about the New Year.

The exact dates are those on which the Sun is at the points where the horizon is tangential to the analemma, which in turn depend on how much the analemma, or the north–south meridian passing through it, is tilted from the vertical. This angle of tilt is essentially the co-latitude (90° minus the latitude) of the observer. Calculating these dates numerically is complex, but they can be estimated fairly accurately by placing a straight-edge, tilted at the appropriate angle, tangential to a diagram of the analemma, and reading the dates (interpolating as necessary) when the Sun is at the positions of contact.

In middle latitudes, the dates get further from the solstices as the absolute value of the latitude decreases. In near-equatorial latitudes, the situation is more complex. The analemma lies almost horizontal, so the horizon can be tangential to it at two points, one in each loop of the analemma. Thus there are two widely separated dates in the year when the Sun rises earlier than on adjoining dates, and so on.

Times of sunrise and sunset
A similar geometrical method, based on the analemma, can be used to find the times of sunrise and sunset at any place on Earth (except within or near the Arctic Circle or Antarctic Circle), on any date.

The origin of the analemma, where the solar declination and the equation of time are both zero, rises and sets at 6 a.m. and 6 p.m. local mean time on every day of the year, irrespective of the observer's latitude. (This estimation does not take account of atmospheric refraction.) If the analemma is drawn in a diagram, tilted at the appropriate angle for an observer's latitude (as described above), and if a horizontal line is drawn to pass through the position of the Sun on the analemma on any given date (interpolating between the date markings as necessary), then at sunrise this line represents the horizon.

The origin appears to move along the celestial equator at a speed of 15° per hour, the speed of the Earth's rotation. The distance along the celestial equator from the point where it intersects the horizon to the position of the origin of the analemma at sunrise is the distance the origin moves between 6 a.m. and the time of sunrise on the given date. Measuring the length of this equatorial segment therefore gives the difference between 6 a.m. and the time of sunrise.

The measurement should, of course, be done on the diagram, but it should be expressed in terms of the angle that would be subtended at an observer on the ground by the corresponding distance in the analemma in the sky. It can be useful to compare it with the length of the analemma, which subtends 47°. Thus, for example, if the length of the equatorial segment on the diagram is 0.4 times the length of the analemma on the diagram, then the segment in the celestial analemma would subtend 0.4 × 47° = 18.8° at the observer on the ground. The angle, in degrees, should be divided by 15 to get the time difference in hours between sunrise and 6 a.m. The sign of the difference is clear from the diagram. If the horizon line at sunrise passes above the origin of the analemma, the Sun rises before 6 a.m., and vice versa.

The same technique can be used, mutatis mutandis, to estimate the time of sunset. Note that the estimated times are in local mean time. Corrections must be applied to convert them to standard time or daylight saving time. These corrections will include a term that involves the observer's longitude, so both the latitude and longitude affect the final result.

Azimuths of sunrise and sunset
The azimuths (true compass bearings) of the points on the horizon where the Sun rises and sets can be easily estimated, using the same diagram as is used to find the times of sunrise and sunset, as described above.

The point where the horizon intersects the celestial equator represents due east or west. The point where the Sun is at sunrise or sunset represents the direction of sunrise or sunset. Simply measuring the distance along the horizon between these points, in angular terms (comparing it with the length of the analemma, as described above), gives the angle between due east or west and the direction of sunrise or sunset. Whether the sunrise or sunset is north or south of due east or west is clear from the diagram. The larger loop of the analemma is at its southern end.

Seen from other planets

On Earth, the analemma appears as a figure-eight, but on other Solar System bodies, it may be very different due to the interplay between the three parameters determining the analemma: axial tilt of each body, eccentricity of the body's elliptic orbit, and position of either apses or equinoxes. Thus, if either of these variables (such as eccentricity) always dominates the other (as is the case on Mars), the analemma will resemble a teardrop. If either of the variables (such as eccentricity) is significant, and the other is practically zero (as is the case on Jupiter, with only a 3° tilt), the figure will be something much closer to an ellipse. If both are important enough, that sometimes eccentricity or axial tilt dominates, a figure-eight results.

In the following list, day and year refer to the synodic day and sidereal year of the particular body:

 Mercury Because orbital resonance makes the day exactly two years long, the method of plotting the Sun's position at the same time each day would yield only a single point. However, the equation of time can still be calculated for any time of the year, so an analemma can be graphed with this information. The resulting curve is a nearly straight east–west line.
 Venus There are slightly less than two days per year, so it would take several years to accumulate a complete analemma by the usual method. The resulting curve is an ellipse.
 Mars Teardrop.
 Jupiter Ellipse.
 Saturn Technically a figure-eight, but the northern loop is so small that it more closely resembles a teardrop.
 Uranus Figure-eight. (Uranus is tilted past sideways to an angle of 98°. Its orbit is about as eccentric as Jupiter's and more eccentric than Earth's.)
 Neptune Figure-eight.

Of geosynchronous satellites

Geosynchronous satellites revolve around the Earth with a period of one sidereal day. Seen from a fixed point on the Earth's surface, they trace paths in the sky which repeat every day, and are therefore simple and meaningful analemmas. They are generally roughly elliptical, teardrop shaped, or figure-8 in shape. Their shapes and dimensions depend on the parameters of the orbits. A subset of geosynchronous satellites are geostationary ones, which ideally have perfectly circular orbits, exactly in the Earth's equatorial plane. A geostationary satellite therefore ideally remains stationary relative to the Earth's surface, staying over a single point on the equator. No real satellite is exactly geostationary, so real ones trace small analemmas in the sky. Since the sizes of the orbits of geosynchronous satellites are similar to the size of the Earth, substantial parallax occurs, depending on the location of the observer on the Earth's surface, so observers in different places see different analemmas.

The paraboloidal dishes that are used for radio communication with geosynchronous satellites often have to move so as to follow the satellite's daily movement around its analemma. The mechanisms that drive them must therefore be programmed with the parameters of the analemma. Exceptions are dishes that are used with (approximately) geostationary satellites, since these satellites appear to move so little that a fixed dish can function adequately at all times.

Of quasi-satellites

A quasi-satellite, such as the one shown in this diagram, moves in a prograde orbit around the Sun, with the same orbital period (which we will call a year) as the planet it accompanies, but with a different (usually greater) orbital eccentricity. It appears, when seen from the planet, to revolve around the planet once a year in the retrograde direction, but at varying speed and probably not in the ecliptic plane. Relative to its mean position, moving at constant speed in the ecliptic, the quasi-satellite  traces an analemma in the planet's sky, going around it once a year.

See also
 Anathem
 Armillary sphere
 De architectura
 Epicycle
 Lemniscate
 On the Dioptra

Notes

References

Further reading

External links

 Analemma Series from Sunrise to Sunset
 Earth Science Photo of the Day (2005-01-22)
 The Equation of Time and the Analemma — by Kieron Taylor
 The Use of the Analemma — from an inset from Bowles's New and Accurate Map of the World (1780)
 Figure-Eight in the Sky — contains link to a C program using a more accurate formula than most (particularly at high inclinations and eccentricities)
 Analemma.com — dedicated to the analemma.
 Calculate and Chart the Analemma — a web site offered by a Fairfax County Public Schools planetarium that describes the analemma and also offers a downloadable spreadsheet that allows the user to experiment with analemmas of varying shapes.
 Analemma Sundial Applet — includes many reference charts.
 Analemmas — by Stephen Wolfram based on a program by Michael Trott, Wolfram Demonstrations Project.
 Analemma in Verse by Tad Dunne
 The Making of a Tutulemma by Tunç Tezel
 Making of a Solargraphy Analemma by Maciej Zapiór and Łukasz Fajfrowski
Equation-of-Time.info - a multipage website with many illustrations and videos dedicated to the Equation of Time, its components, its history, how it can be displayed in tables, curves, analemmas, etc., its use to correct sundials, astronomy, clocks, how it can be produced mechanically and much more : by Kevin Karney
Earth and Sun — an interactive blog post explaining the phenomenon
Astronomy Picture of the Day
 2002-07-09 — Analemma
 2003-03-20 — Sunrise Analemma
 2004-06-21 — Analemma over Ancient Nemea
 2005-07-13 — Analemma of the Moon
 2006-12-23 — Analemma over the Temple of Olympian Zeus
 2006-12-30 — Martian Analemma at Sagan Memorial Station (simulated)
 2007-06-17 — Analemma over Ukraine
 2007-12-04 — Analemma over New Jersey (film)
 2008-12-21 — Analemma over the Porch of Maidens
 2009-12-20 — Tutulemma: Solar Eclipse Analemma
 2010-12-31 — Analemma 2010
 2012-09-20 — Sunrise Analemma (with a little extra)
 2013-10-14 — High Noon Analemma Over Azerbaijan
 2014-03-20 — Solargraphy Analemma

Dynamics of the Solar System
Solar phenomena
Sundials
Articles containing video clips